The Free Royal Cities Act (full Polish title:  Miasta Nasze Królewskie wolne w państwach Rzeczypospolitej; English:  "Our Free Royal Cities in the States of the Commonwealth", or the Law on the Cities, Prawo o miastach) was an act adopted by the Four-Year Sejm (1788–92) of the Polish–Lithuanian Commonwealth on April 18, 1791 in the runup to the adoption of the Constitution of May 3, 1791. The Act was subsequently incorporated in extenso into the Constitution by reference in its Article III.

The Act granted to the Commonwealth's townspeople of the royal cities personal security, the right to acquire landed property, and eligibility for military officers' commissions, public offices. It did not give them the rights of szlachta (nobles) but allowed the possibility for ennoblement. It also provided townspeople right for representation in the Sejm as advisers in the cities' affairs.

See also
Black Procession
Jan Dekert

Notes

References
 Joseph Kasparek, The Constitutions of Poland and of the United States:  Kinships and Genealogy, Miami, American Institute of Polish Culture, 1980, pp. 31–33.

1791 in law
Legal history of Poland
Great Sejm